Popovci may refer to:

 Popovci, Slovenia, a village near Videm, Slovenia
 Popovci (Aleksandrovac), a village near Aleksandrovac, Serbia
 Popovci, Croatia, a village near Pakrac, Croatia